Richard "Aukcoo" Fowler (1948–2016) was an American wilderness guide, naturalist, and former U.S. Army Ranger based in Iquitos, a city in the Peruvian Amazon.

Life and career
Fowler was born in the U.S. state of Florida in 1948. He enlisted in the Army in 1968, during the Vietnam War. He was assigned to a long-range reconnaissance patrol in the 101st Airborne Division. He served two tours of duty, and took part in the Battle of Huế, the Battle of Hamburger Hill, and the Tet Offensive. Fowler says he enlisted in part because he was drawn to the rainforest; once there, he felt that it gave reason to the chaos of his life. He expatriated to Peru in 1994, and continued to live much of his life in the jungle. He made a living as a wilderness guide, catering to those who preferred a jungle experience based on survival skills. In his study of nature, he became a specialist in reptiles.

Bill Grimes, a business owner in Iquitos, was acquainted with Fowler: "Richard's niche is mostly hard core, adventurous, soldier of fortune, survivalist types. His tours are rough, with few comforts." Another commenter described Fowler as a "hero of people whose personal libraries consist of exactly: Soldier of Fortune back issues, Gary Larson cartoons, Apocalypse Now: The Picture Book, and Heart of Darkness". Indeed, Fowler sometimes advertized in Soldier of Fortune, a mercenary magazine published in the US. "He told us that his home was the jungle," wrote Lawrence Winkler, one of Fowler's clients. "Iquitos was just a refueling stop, a few days of spirits and smokes and señoritas, and story-swapping sagas, too incredible not to be true."

In the works of travel writers
Fowler features in writer-filmmaker Tahir Shah's travel books Trail of Feathers (2001) and House of the Tiger King (2003). Shah writes that when he first arrived in Iquitos, he searched for a guide to take him into the Amazon rainforest for his Trail of Feathers expedition. An American expat called Max tells him, "You need a man who can trek through the rain-forest in the dead of night ... A man who can kill an anaconda with his bare hands; who can live on a diet of tree grubs washed down with his own urine; a man who's taken ayahuasca a hundred times, who'll protect you if it means sacrificing his own life ... a man who has no fear." Max then presents him with Fowler, who, according to Max, fulfills all the above requirements. Shah recounts his first impression of Fowler:

Fowler tells him, "I promise that if you hire me, I will keep you alive." In the dedication for Trail of Feathers, Shah writes: "I am grateful to Richard Fowler, 101st Airborne Division, for keeping his promise." Shah soon returned to Peru to search for a film and book project based on the search for the legendary Inca city of Paititi. He rehired Fowler, but reluctantly. "I had vowed never to communicate with him again", Shah explains, "[but] I needed a security man. However impossible he was, Richard was a known entity." Fowler appears in the documentary film made during the expedition: House of the Tiger King (2004), directed by David Flamholc.

Another travel writer who experienced a Fowler tour was former NASA engineer Lawrence Winkler, who had read Tahir's work. He recounts his experience in his 2016 travelogue, Stout Men.

Notes

References

External links
 
 

1948 births
2016 deaths
United States Army personnel of the Vietnam War
United States Army soldiers
American expatriates in Peru
American naturalists
Tour guides